Evisu or Evisu Genes is a Japanese designer clothing company that specializes in producing denim wear through traditional, labor-intensive methods.
The brand was founded in 1991 in Osaka, Japan, by Hidehiko Yamane.

Production

The initial production line allowed about 14 pairs of jeans a day to be produced, with each of them having a seagull (kamome) hand painted on them by Yamane himself.  Ebisu is the name of the Japanese folk god of money who is usually portrayed with a fishing rod. 

In the early 1990s Yamane introduced a tailoring line, followed by fishing and golf lines. In 1999, he introduced a ladies fashion line called Evisu Donna to complete the development of Evisu as a full-fashion range going far beyond a jeans brand. Evisu has 65 shops in Japan.

Legal issues
In March 2006, the company and Yamane were reported to Tokyo District Public Prosecutor's Office with another firm on suspicion of tax evasion. Yamane and the two firms stood accused of concealing more than 500 million yen of income as well as evading some 160 million yen in taxes over three years.

Personnel changes
In 2009, Evisu was relaunched, and Scott Morrison, the co-founder of Paper Denim & Cloth and Earnest Sewn, was added to the Evisu team as CEO and creative director.

In popular culture

The brand has been mentioned in several songs, including Mase's Harlem Lullaby, Jay-Z's "Show You How" and "Jigga That Nigga", in Young Jeezy's track "Bury Me a G", The Game's "Down for My Niggaz", T.I.'s "ASAP", Lil Wayne's "Lock & Load," The Carters' "Apeshit", De Jeugd van Tegenwoordig's "Shenkie", Club Dogo's "Spacco tutto",  and Gucci Mane's "Freaky Girl".

References

External links
 Official Evisu Site
 Official Japanese Site

Jeans by brand
Clothing brands of Japan
Clothing companies established in 1991
Clothing companies of Japan
Japanese brands
Companies based in Osaka Prefecture
Japanese companies established in 1991